Henry Robin Romilly Fedden, CBE, (1908–1977) was an English writer, diplomat and mountaineer. He was the son of artist Romilly Fedden and novelist Katherine Waldo Douglas.

Raised mostly in Chantemesle, France, Fedden went to Cambridge University to read English. He served as a diplomat in Athens and taught English literature at Cairo University. He was one of the Cairo poets, and co-edited the literary journal Personal Landscape with Lawrence Durrell and Bernard Spencer. After World War II, he worked for the National Trust, rising to the post of Deputy Director-General. He retired in 1973.

He had a wide variety of interests, which were reflected in the books he wrote. The best known of these are The Enchanted Mountains and Chantemesle. He also wrote several guidebooks for the National Trust. He was a dedicated mountaineer, a pursuit he took up in his late thirties.

He was married to Renee Fedden; they had two daughters. He died in 1977.

Henry Miller disliked Fedden. He recalled their meetings in Athens when he later wrote bitterly of expatriate Englishmen in The Colossus of Maroussi. Miller "hated [Fedden's] stammer and his effete way of talking and ... framed a sharply satirical portrait of him in the Colossus," wrote Durrell in a letter in 1977.  But Durrell recognised that 'behind the slight stoop and stutter that were part of Fedden's disarming charm, there was a sharply critical mind interrogating the cultures of Europe and the East, and he looked up to him as he did to none of his other contemporaries' during the war years.

Selected works
 The Enchanted Mountains: A Quest in the Pyrenees 
 Alpine Ski Tour 1956
 Chantemesle (1964; reissued by Eland Books in 2002)
 The National Trust Guide
 Treasures of the National Trust
 The Continuing Purpose: History of the National Trust, Its Aims and Work
 The National Trust: Past and Present 
 Churchill And Chartwell 
 The Land of Egypt
 Crusader Castles 
 The Country House Guide 
 Suicide: A Social and Historical Study
 Syria and Lebanon 
 Syria: An historical appreciation 
 English Travellers in the Near East 
 Anglesey Abbey
 Petworth House
 Egypt: Land of the Valley

References

British travel writers
Commanders of the Order of the British Empire
1908 births
1977 deaths